Yoon Hae-young (born January 5, 1972) is a South Korean actress. She began acting after passing the SBS Open Auditions in 1993, and has starred in television dramas such as See and See Again (1998), This Is Love (2001), Elephant (2008), The Tale of Janghwa and Hongryeon (also known as Love and Obsession, 2009), Special Task Force MSS (2011) and I Like You (2012).

Filmography

Television series

Film

Variety/radio show

Awards and nominations

References

External links 

 Yoon Hae-young Fan Cafe at Daum 
 Yoon Hae-young  at Happy Actors 
 
 
 

1972 births
Living people
South Korean television actresses
South Korean film actresses
Kyonggi University alumni
People from Seoul